Edith Kiel (30 June 1904 – 12 September 1993) was a German film producer, screenwriter, editor and director who worked mainly in the Flemish section of the Belgian film  – industry. After starting out at Germany's largest studio, UFA, she moved to Belgium where she worked alongside her husband Jan Vanderheyden.

Selected filmography
Director
 Een aardig geval (1941)
 Schipperskwartier (1953)
 Een zonde waard (1959)
 De stille genieter (1961)

Screenwriter
 De witte (1934)
 Alleen voor U (1935)
 Uilenspiegel leeft nog (1935)
 De wonderdokter (1936)
 Havenmuziek (1937) 
 Drie flinke kerels (1938)
 Met den helm geboren (1939)
 Janssens tegen Peeters (1939)
 Een engel van een man (1939)
 Wit is troef (1940)
 Janssens en Peeters dikke vrienden (1940)
 Veel geluk, Monika (1941)
 Een aardig geval (1941)
 Antoon, de flierefluiter (1942)
 De stille genieter (1961)

Film Editor
 Havenmuziek (1937) 
 Drie flinke kerels (1938)
 Met den helm geboren (1939)
 Janssens tegen Peeters (1939)
 Een engel van een man (1939)
 Wit is troef (1940)
 Janssens en Peeters dikke vrienden (1940)
 De stille genieter (1961)

Art Director
 De stille genieter (1961)

Sources
 Mathijs, Ernest. The Cinema of the Low Countries. Wallflower Press, 2004.

External links

1904 births
1993 deaths
Film people from Berlin
German film producers
German film editors
German film directors
20th-century German women writers
20th-century German screenwriters
German women film editors
German women film producers
German women film directors